Laubmann is a German language surname. Notable people with the name include:
 Alfred Laubmann (1886–1965), German zoologist and ornithologist
 Georg von Laubmann (1843–1909), German philologist and librarian

References 

German-language surnames